Mark Schenning (born 18 October 1970) is a Dutch professional football manager and former player. He spent his entire career in the Netherlands, playing for clubs such as Go Ahead Eagles, Willem II, Den Bosch and NAC Breda.

After retirement, Schenning enrolled into management. He first took change of the Willem II's women team for one season, before moving on to the primary outfit in a caretaker role. Some months later, Schenning descended into the lower divisions, first being appointed of Hoofdklasse B amateur club RKSV Schijndel for two years. Schenning is at present in charge of Hoofdklasse club OJC Rosmalen, a position he has held since 2019.

Club career

Early career
Schenning started his career at Robur et Velocitas, before transferring to Go Ahead Eagles, where he was promoted to the senior side in 1987. He played in nine seasons for the club, before leaving in 1996.

Willem II
In July 1996, Schenning joined Willem II for a fee of ƒ1 million, signing a three-year contract. He made his league debut on 21 August 1996 in a 0–0 away draw against Groningen. Schenning scored his first goal in the 1997–98 season on 26 April 1998 against RKC Waalwijk, a match Willem won 4–1. During the 1999–2000 season, he participated in their UEFA Champions League season, where he scored once against Sparta Prague in the first group stage on 20 October 1999, which Willem lost 4–3.

Den Bosch
In February 2000, Schenning completed a move to Den Bosch, joining Christopher Wreh. Schenning made his first appearance against PSV Eindhoven on 6 February 2000 in a 6–2 home loss at De Vliert. During the club's 2000–01 season, which saw them compete in the Eerste Divisie, following their relegation from the top flight, he netted his first league goal on 4 September 2000 in a 2–0 win played at 's-Hertogenbosch over TOP Oss, in which he was also ejected after a foul. It proved to be his only goal, as Schenning was dismissed by the side along with ten other players due to their economic difficulties.

NAC Breda
On 31 October 2000, it was announced that Schenning had been purchased by NAC Breda on a two-and a half-year deal.

Managerial career
Schenning managed the women's team of Willem II from 2009 to 2010. The same year, he served as an assistant manager to Edwin Hermans for the Willem II reserves a short period of time. Schenning was unveiled as the interim manager of the main club on 19 February 2010, taking over after Alfons Groenendijk. A few months later, on 2 November 2010, Schenning was given the managerial post of RKSV Schijndel, staying there until 2012. He penned a contract in December 2012 with VV UNA, making him the new head coach of the club. 

After four-and-a-half years in charge of UNA, Schenning was appointed manager of VVSB in the summer of 2017. In November of the same year, however, he was dismissed with the board citing disagreements between him and the team as well as disappointing results.

In January 2019, Schenning became the new manager of OJC Rosmalen.

Personal life
Schenning resides in Hilvarenbeek. He has two children, Eline and Bas.

Career statistics

Managerial statistics

References

External links
Mark Schenning at NAC Breda

1970 births
Living people
Sportspeople from Apeldoorn
Dutch footballers
Dutch football managers
Association football defenders
Eerste Divisie players
Eredivisie players
Go Ahead Eagles players
Willem II (football club) players
FC Den Bosch players
NAC Breda players
Eredivisie managers
Willem II (football club) managers
VV UNA managers
Willem II (football club) non-playing staff
VVSB managers
Footballers from Gelderland